Erythrochiton is a genus of plant in family Rutaceae. It contains the following species (but this list may be incomplete):
 Erythrochiton brasiliensis Nees & Mart.
 Erythrochiton delitescens Morton
 Erythrochiton fallax Kallunki
 Erythrochiton giganteus Kaastra & A.H.Gentry
 Erythrochiton gymnanthus Kallunki
 Erythrochiton hypophyllanthus Planch. & Linden
 Erythrochiton lindenii Planch. & Linden
 Erythrochiton macrophyllum Makoy ex Hook.
 Erythrochiton macropodum K.Krause
 Erythrochiton odontoglossus Kallunki
 Erythrochiton trichanthus Kallunki
 Erythrochiton trifoliatum Pilg.

Many species of this genus are characterised by having epiphyllous flowers, which emerge from the leaf itself, rather than the more usual site of a leaf axil, a plant axis, or its inflorescence.

References

 
Zanthoxyloideae genera
Flora of Central America
Flora of northern South America
Taxonomy articles created by Polbot